This is a list of United States Air Force fighter wings assigned to Strategic Air Command.

1st Fighter Wing "Aut Vincere Aut Mori" (Latin) or "Conquer or Die" 
Assigned from: Fourth Air Force on 1 May 1949.
At: March AFB, CA.
Assigned to: Strategic Air Command, Fifteenth Air Force, (Attached to the 22d Bomb Wing from 1 July 1949 to 1 April 1950).
Equipment: B-26s, B-29s, F-80, F-86s, L-4s, L-5s, L-13s, RB-26s, RF-80s.
Redesignated as: 1st Fighter Interceptor Wing on 16 April 1950.

1st Fighter Interceptor Wing reassigned to Fourth Air Force on 1 July 1950. Trained in fighter and reconnaissance operations and supported strategic bombardment training, 1947–1950. Was integrated experimentally with a reconnaissance wing, 1947–1949, and with the 22d Bomb Wing, sharing commanders during much of this time. Supported Operation Haylift, a humanitarian effort to deliver food to snowbound cattle in the western United States, 1949.

4th Fighter Wing "Fourth but First"
Established on: 27 July 1947.
Organized on: 15 August 1947.
At: Andrews AAF, MD.
Assigned to: Strategic Air Command on 15 August 1947.
Equipment: F-80s.
Reassigned to: Fourteenth Air Force on 1 December 1948.

Performed tactical operations as part of air defense in the United States 1947–1948. Flew air defense with own components and reconnaissance and bombardment with attached 363rd Tactical Reconnaissance Group.

12th Wings "The Spirit Conquers All"

12th Fighter Day Wing

Redesignated on: 1 July 1957.
At: Bergstromn AFB, TX.
Assigned to: Strategic Air Command, Second Air Force, 42nd Air Division.
Equipment: F-84s, KB-29s.
Inactivated on: 8 January 1958.

12th Fighter Escort Wing

Activated on: 1 November 1950.
At: Turner AFB, GA.
Assigned to: Second Air Force.
Equipment: F-84s.
Moved to: Bergstrom AFB, TX, on 5 December 1950.
Reassigned to: Eighth Air Force on 5 December 1950.
Reassigned to: Eighth Air Force, 42nd Air Division on 9 April 1951. (Attached to the 7th Air Division from 20 July to 30 November 1951).
Redesignated on: 20 January 1953 as 12th Strategic Fighter Wing.

12th Strategic Fighter Wing

Redesignated on: 20 January 1953.
At: Bergstromn AFB, TX.
Assigned to: Eighth Air Force, 42nd Air Division. (Attached to the 39th Air Division (Defense) from 18 May to 10 August 1954).
Equipment: F-84s.
Changed equipment in: 1955 to F-84s, KB-29s.
Redesignated as: 12th Fighter – Day Wing on 1 July 1957.

Provided fighter escort, air defense for SAC bomber forces, 1950–1957. Deployed at Manston RAF Station, England 20 July.-30-Nov. 1951, and at Misawa, AB, Japan, 15 May −10 August. 1953 and 10 May – 11 August. 1954. Provided Air refuelling support, 1955–1957. From mid 1957 until inactivated in 1958 deployed to Southeast Asia.

27th Wings"Intelligence Strength"

27th Fighter Escort Wing

Redesignated on: 1 February 1950.
At: Bergstrom AFB, TX.
Assigned to: Strategic Air Command, Eighth Air Force.
Equipment: F-82s, F-84s.
Changed equipment in: 1951 to F-84s.
Reassigned to: Eighth Air Force, 42nd Air Division on 6 August 1951. (Attached to the Far East Air Forces from 6 to 13 October 1952). (Attached to the 39th Air Division (Defense) from 13 October 1952 to 13 February 1953).
Redesignated on: 20 January 1953 as 27th Strategic fighter Wing.

27th Fighter Wing

Established on: 28 July 1947.
Organized on: 15 August 1947.
At: Kearney AFB, NE.
Assigned to: Eighth Air Force.  (Attached to the Far East Air Forces  from 19 to 29 November 1950). (Attached to the Fifth Air Force from 30 November 1950 to 15 July 1951).
Equipment: F-51s.
Changed equipment in: 1948 to F-51s, F-82s.
Moved to:Berstrom AFB, TX., on 16 March 1949.
Changed equipment in: 1950 to F-82s, F-84s.
Redesignated as: 27th Fighter Escort Wing on 1 February 1950 as

27th Strategic Fighter Wing

Redesignated on: 20 January 1953.
At: Bergstrom AFB, TX.
Assigned to: Eighth Air Force,
42nd Air Division.
Equipment: F-84s, KB-29s.
Reassigned to: Second Air Force,  42nd Air Division on 1 April 1955.  (Attached to the 7th Air Division  from 1 May to 1 August 1955).
Changed equipment in: 1958 to F-84s.
Reassigned to: Twelfth Air Force on8 January 1958.

Fighter escort operations to meet SAC commitments, 1947–1950. Won the Mackay Trophy for successful deployment of 90 F-84Es from Bergstrom AFB, TX, to Furstenfeldbruck AB, Germany, in Sept. 1950, via Labrador, Greenland, Iceland, and England. This was the first long-range mass flight of jet aircraft in aviation history. Deployed at Yokota AB, Japan, 19–30 November. 1950, then split into two echelons. The advance echelon deployed at Taegu AB, South Korea, 1 December. 1950-30 January 1951, while the rear echelon deployed at Itazuke AB, Japan, 9 December. 1950-31 January 1951. Flew combat in Korea, 6 December. 1950-30 June. 1951, including armed reconnaissance, interdiction, fighter escort, and close air support missions. The two echelons of the wing combined at Itazuke on 1 February. 1951, continuing combat from that base. Returned to the United States in Jul. 1951 but deployed to provide air defense at Misawa AB, Japan, 6 October. 1952-13 February. 1953. Added Air refueling as a mission, Jun. 1953 – May 1955 and Aug. 1955-Jun. 1957. Wing pilot Capt. Forrest W. Wilson, won the Allison Trophy jet aircraft race of the National Aircraft Show at Dayton, OH, on 6 September. 1953, flying the 110.3-mile course in an F-84G, at an average speed of 537.802 mph in 12:17.2 minutes. Deployed at Sturgate RAF Station, England, 7 May – 17 August. 1955. Emblem approved on 11 July 1952.

31st Wings "Return With Honor"

31st Fighter Escort Wing

Redesignated on: 16 July 1950.
At: Turner AFB, GA.
Assigned to: Strategic Air Command, Second Air Force.
Equipment: F-84s.
Reassigned to: Second Air Force,  40th Air Division in 1951. (Attached to the 39th Air Division (Defense) from 10 July to 11 October 1952). (Attached to the 39th Air Division (Defense) from 10 November 1953 to 12 February 1954).
Redesignated as: 31st Strategic Fighter Wing on 
20 January 1953.

31st Strategic Fighter Wing

Redesignated on: 20 January 1953.
At: Turner AFB, GA.
Assigned to: Second Air Force,  40th Air Division.
Equipment: F-84s.
Changed equipment in: 1954 to F-84s, KB-29s.
Changed equipment in: 1955 to F-84s.
Changed equipment in: 1956 to F-84s, KB-29s.
Reassigned to: Ninth Air Force on 1 April 1957.

While located at Turner Field (later, AFB), GA From Dec. 1950 through Jul. 1951, all tactical and most support components deployed to England. Thereafter, deployed to provide air defense in Japan, Jul.-Oct. 1952 and Nov. 1953-Feb. 1954. Earned an outstanding unit award for making the first massed jet fighter crossing of the Pacific Ocean, in Jul. 1952. Rotated tactical components to Alaska, 1956–1957. Emblem approved 19 December 1951.

33rd Fighter Wing "Fire From the Clouds" 

Established on: 15 October 1947.
Organized on: 5 November 1947.
At: Roswell AAF, NM.
Assigned to: Strategic Air Command, Eighth Air Force.  (Attached to the 509th Bomb Wing from 17 November 1947 to 15 November 1948).
Equipment: F-51s, F-84s.
Reassigned to: First Air Force on 1 December 1948.

Wing headquarters was not operational and all components detached, Nov. 1947-Nov. 1948. The 509th Bombardment Wing at Walker AFB, NM, controlled the wing's tactical units.

56th Fighter Wing "Thunderbolts"

Organized on: 1 May 1946
At: Selfridge AAF, MI.
Assigned to: Strategic Air Command, Fifteenth Air Force.
Equipment: F-47s, F-51s.
Reassigned to: Strategic Air Command on 1 October 1947.
Changed equipment in: 1947 to F-80s.
Reassigned to: Tenth Air Force on 1 December 1948.

Supported exercises, operations, and training programs of SAC, 1947–1948. Pioneered the first west-to-east jet fighter transatlantic crossing along the northern air route in Jul. 1948.

71st Strategic Reconnaissance Wing, Fighter
See 71st Flying Training Wing

82nd Fighter Escort Wing
See 82d Training Wing

407th Strategic Fighter Wing
See 407th Air Expeditionary Group

Units and formations of Strategic Air Command